Elections to Cumbria County Council were held on 2 May 1985. This was on the same day as other UK county council elections. The whole council of 83 members was up for election and the Labour Party lost control of the council, which fell under no overall control.

Results

References

Cumbria
1985
1980s in Cumbria